Boom Shot is a 1942 song composed by Glenn Miller and Billy May for the 20th Century Fox movie Orchestra Wives starring George Montgomery and Ann Rutherford.

Billy May is credited as his first wife, Arletta May, because he had signed an exclusive composer's contract with Charlie Barnet that prohibited him from writing anything for Miller under his own name. The song was published by Mutual Music Society in the U.S. and by Chappell and Company in the UK.

Though uncredited on the film soundtrack, "Boom Shot" appears in the movie Orchestra Wives twice, first as a 78 by Gene Morrison and His Orchestra on the Wurlitzer jukebox in the soda shop, then during the outdoor concert scene featuring Harry Morgan and Ann Rutherford dancing. Glenn Miller as Gene Morrison is shown conducting his orchestra on the bandstand. The title comes from the wide-angle, mobile camera shot used to film the scene, known as a boom shot. The arrangement is by George Williams.

Recordings 

"Boom Shot" was first released on the 1958 gatefold, double LP released by Twentieth Century Fox entitled Original Film Sound Tracks by Glenn Miller and His Orchestra, TCF 100-2, which featured music from both the Orchestra Wives and Sun Valley Serenade movies. "Boom Shot" also appeared on the reissued albums Glenn Miller's Original Film Sound Tracks as Fox-3020, 3021, TFS-3020e, 3021e, in two volumes, which was reissued in 2009 by Hallmark. It is also on the 2000 Jasmine CD Glenn Miller On Film, Remember Glenn: Selections from the Sound Tracks of Sun Valley Serenade and Orchestra Wives, 20th Century, T-904, and the 2008 Acrobat Music CD On the Alamo. The song also appeared on the 1973 two disc set Remember Glenn on 20th Century Records.

In May, 1959, "Boom Shot" was released as a 7" 45 A side single by the British Top Rank label with "You Say the Sweetest Things, Baby" by the Glenn Miller Six as JAR-114. The single was also released as a 78. A 45 single was also released in the U.S. on the 20th Fox label in December, 1958 as 45-122.

"Boom Shot" features a trumpet solo by Johnny Best, which is edited out in the film, with Billy May on muted trumpet, Ernie Caceres on alto saxophone, and Glenn Miller on trombone. 

Ray McKinley and the New Glenn Miller Orchestra recorded the song as "Boomshot" on the 1959 RCA Victor LP album Dance Anyone?, LPM-2193. The Jack Million Band recorded it on the album In the Mood for Glenn Miller, Vol. 2. The 1959 recording appeared on the 2002	
Best of New Glenn Miller Orchestra in 2002 on BMG. The Glenn Miller Orchestra under Musical Director Larry O'Brien released a recording on the album On the Air, (CD, 2002, XM Radio). A new recording by the Glenn Miller Orchestra conducted by Wil Salden appeared on the 2005 album Meets the Giants of Jazz, Swing and Entertainment on Koch/Universal. The 1959 recording featured on Dance Anyone? by Ray McKinley and The Glenn Miller Orchestra was released on CD on Montpellier.

The Jack Million Band performed "Boom Shot" at the 2008 Glenn Miller Festival on June 13, 2008 in the Clarinda High School auditorium in Clarinda, Iowa.

The Glenn Miller Orchestra performed the instrumental at the 2022 Glenn Miller Festival in Clarinda, Iowa at the Glenn Miller Birthplace Museum.

"Boom Shot" was on the concert setlist of the Glenn Miller Orchestra during the 2022 tour.

References

Sources

 Flower, John. Moonlight Serenade: A Bio-discography of the Glenn Miller Civilian Band. New Rochelle, NY: Arlington House, 1972.
 Simon, George Thomas. Simon Says. New York: Galahad, 1971. .
 Simon, George T. Glenn Miller and His Orchestra, Da Capo Press, 1980. .

External links 
 Arrangement by Alan Glasscock. "'Boom Shot' is a rare gem of a chart from the Glenn Miller book, co-written by Mr. Miller himself. It swings with a lilt (if not played too fast) and features your 2nd Trumpet as well as solos (written) for 1st Alto & Trombone, and space for some background improvised Piano too. The song itself is unusual, being not much more that an 8 bar melody, but the orchestration is superb and the series of modulations that run through the chart give the whole thing a series of constant kicks that keep it fresh and moving. Baritone doubles on Alto." Lush Life Music. ejazzlines.com. Retrieved 23 August 2022.
 "Boom Shot" arrangement by Alan Glasscock. ejazzlines.com. Retrieved 23 August 2022.
 Online version on mp3bear.com.
 Online version on beemp3.com. 
 "Boom Shot" from Original Film Sound Tracks. 1959. 20th Fox. Retrieved 23 August 2022.
 "Boomshot" from Dance Anyone? LP, 1959 by The New Glenn Miller Orchestra. Retrieved 23 August 2022.
 "Boom Shot" by the Jack Million Band, selection 10.

Glenn Miller songs
1942 songs
Jazz songs
Jazz compositions
Dance music songs
Swing music
Instrumentals
Songs written for films
Songs written by Billy May